Loco de Amor (English: Crazy in Love) is the sixth studio album by Colombian recording artist Juanes, released on March 11, 2014, by Universal Music Latino. It is his first studio album since P.A.R.C.E. (2010). At the Latin Grammy Awards of 2014, the album received the award for Best Pop/Rock Album. Loco de Amor was nominated for Lo Nuestro Award for Pop Album of the Year. It was nominated for a Grammy Award for Best Latin Pop Album in 2015.

Background & release
In May 2012, Juanes released a live album Juanes: MTV Unplugged under the production of the Dominican musician Juan Luis Guerra, an album based in a compilation of all his hits but in acoustic version. It garnered critical acclaim and was a commercial success internationally, compared to his last studio album P.A.R.C.E. (2010).

On January 30, Juanes revealed the title of the album the social networks with a short message: My feeling is reflected in three words Loco de Amor. It was additionally announced that the record would be released on March 11, 2014, worldwide. Its cover artwork was revealed in his official webpage, and sees Juanes black dressed looking at the horizon, in the background is the sea and some mountains at sunset. Later revealed that a Target-exclusive deluxe version of the record would be made available for pre-order on February 18.

Singles 
"La Luz" was released as the lead single from Loco de Amor on December 16, 2013. Its accompanying music video was directed by Jessy Terrero.

"Mil Pedazos" was released as the second single on March 7, 2014, in YouTube.

"Una Flor" was released on June 10, 2014, as the third single from the record.

Track listing

Charts

Weekly charts

Year-end charts

Certifications and sales

Release history

References 

2014 albums
Juanes albums
Spanish-language albums
Universal Music Latino albums
Albums produced by Steve Lillywhite
Latin Grammy Award for Best Pop/Rock Album